A serine/threonine protein kinase is a kinase enzyme, in particular a protein kinase,  that phosphorylates the OH group of the amino-acid residues serine or threonine, which have similar side chains. At least 350 of the 500+ human protein kinases are serine/threonine kinases (STK).

In enzymology, the term serine/threonine protein kinase describes a class of enzymes in the family of transferases, that transfer phosphates to the oxygen atom of a serine or threonine side chain in proteins. This process is called phosphorylation. Protein phosphorylation in particular plays a significant role in a wide range of cellular processes and is a very important posttranslational modification.

The chemical reaction performed by these enzymes can be written as

ATP + a protein  ADP + a phosphoprotein

Thus, the two substrates of this enzyme are ATP and a protein, whereas its two products are ADP and phosphoprotein.

The systematic name of this enzyme class is ATP:protein phosphotransferase (non-specific).

Function
Serine/threonine kinases play a role in the regulation of cell proliferation, programmed cell death (apoptosis), cell differentiation, and embryonic development.

Selectivity
While serine/threonine kinases all phosphorylate serine or threonine residues in their substrates, they select specific residues to phosphorylate on the basis of residues that flank the phosphoacceptor site, which together comprise the consensus sequence. Since the consensus sequence residues of a target substrate only make contact with several key amino acids within the catalytic cleft of the kinase (usually through hydrophobic forces and ionic bonds), a kinase is usually not specific to a single substrate, but instead can phosphorylate a whole "substrate family" which share common recognition sequences. While the catalytic domain of these kinases is highly conserved, the sequence variation that is observed in the kinome (the subset of genes in the genome that encode kinases) provides for recognition of distinct substrates. Many kinases are inhibited by a pseudosubstrate that binds to the kinase like a real substrate but lacks the amino acid to be phosphorylated. When the pseudosubstrate is removed, the kinase can perform its normal function.

EC numbers
Many serine/threonine protein kinases do not have their own individual EC numbers and use "2.7.11.1". These were formerly included in EC number "2.7.1.37", which was a general EC number for any enzyme that phosphorylates proteins while converting ATP to ADP (i.e., ATP:protein phosphotransferases.)

Types

Types include those acting directly as membrane-bound receptors (Receptor protein serine/threonine kinase) and intracellular kinases participating in Signal transduction. Of the latter, types include:

Clinical significance
 
Serine/threonine kinase (STK) expression is altered in many types of cancer. Limited benefit of serine/threonine kinase inhibitors has been demonstrated in ovarian cancer but studies are ongoing to evaluate their safety and efficacy.

Serine/threonine protein kinase p90-kDa ribosomal S6 kinase (RSK) is in involved in development of some prostate cancers.

Raf inhibition has become the target for new anti-metastatic cancer drugs as they inhibit the MAPK cascade and reduce cell proliferation.

See also
 Protein serine/threonine phosphatase, enzyme for reverse process.
 Pseudokinase, a protein without enzyme activity (pseudoenzyme). It can be related to proteins of this class.
 ATM serine/threonine kinase, responsible for the disorder ataxia–telangiectasia.

References

External links
 

EC 2.7.11
Protein kinases
Enzymes of known structure